Henry County Courthouse is a county courthouse in McDonough, Georgia, county seat of Henry County, Georgia. It was built in 1897 in a Romanesque Revival architecture style according to designs by Golucke & Stewart. It was added to the National Register of Historic Places on September 18, 1980. It is located in Courthouse Square.

It is also a contributing building in the McDonough Historic District.

See also
National Register of Historic Places listings in Henry County, Georgia

References

County courthouses in Georgia (U.S. state)
Courthouses on the National Register of Historic Places in Georgia (U.S. state)
Government buildings completed in 1897
Romanesque Revival architecture in Georgia (U.S. state)
Buildings and structures in Henry County, Georgia
National Register of Historic Places in Henry County, Georgia